WFNY (1440 AM) is a commercial radio station licensed to Gloversville, New York, United States. Programming primarily consists of what is known as a variety format, focusing on pop music from the 1950s to the 1980s, along with community oriented local productions, national news and business news from Fox News Radio and the local weather forecast, as the station has no local news department. WFNY serves the area of Upstate New York including the Mohawk Valley, Southern Adirondacks, and portions of the Capital Region.  The station is owned by local businessman Michael A. Sleezer.

The station also simulcasts on W231CF 94.1 FM.

References

External links

FNY
Radio stations established in 2002
2002 establishments in New York (state)